Varnsdorf is a town in the Ústí nad Labem Region of the Czech Republic. It has about 15,000 inhabitants. It lies on the border with Germany.

Administrative parts

Villages of Studánka and Světliny 1.díl are administrative parts of Varnsdorf.

Geography
It lies in the salient region of Šluknov Hook, on the border with Germany.

Varnsdorf is situated in the Lusatian Highlands. The Mandau river flows through the town.

History
The first written mention of Varnsdorf is from 1357. In 1681 Varnsdorf with the whole manor was purchased by the House of Liechtenstein and it remained in their possession until 1919.

In 1849, Old Varnsdorf merged with five municipalities and created a new municipality called Varnsdorf. It was the largest municipality in Austrian Empire by population without town rights. In 1868, Warnsdorf became a town.

Prior to the end of World War I, Varnsdorf was part of the Austro-Hungarian Empire. Following that war, the Treaty of Saint-Germain-en-Laye incorporated it, together with the region of Bohemia, into the new country of Czechoslovakia.

Before the Holocaust, 211 Jews lived in Varnsdorf. Following the end of World War II, its ethnic German population was mostly expelled to Germany, and the official spelling of its name was changed from the German "Warnsdorf" to the Czech "Varnsdorf".

In 1980, the municipality of Studánka joined Varnsdorf.

Demographics

Around 2,500 Buddhist Vietnamese live in and around Varnsdorf. In 2008 the Thien An Buddhist Pagoda was consecrated in Varnsdorf, the first Vietnamese Buddhist temple in the Czech Republic.

Economy
Varnsdorf is an industrial centre of the region. The town became well known for the texile industry. Its tradition here dates back to 1777, when the Velveta company was founded and became a significant manufacturer of cotton fabrics, especially for clothing purposes. Other big textile company with headquarters in Varnsdorf is Frottana, producer of towels.

The engineering industry is represented by Továrny obráběcích strojů – TOS company (machine tools manufacturer) and KWL s.r.o., producer of cable harnesses.

Varnsdorf is also home to the Kocour Brewery, who make a range of ales, including American style IPA and a stout.

Transport
Varnsdorf has road border crossings to the Saxon towns of Seifhennersdorf and Großschönau, and a railway border crossing to Großschönau.

Varnsdorf lies on a regional railway line from Seifhennersdorf to Liberec, and on a local railway line from Varnsdorf to Rybniště. The town is served by three train stations.

Culture
Varnsdorf is home to the Town Theatre Varnsdorf. The theatre building includes a gallery.

Sport
The town's football club FK Varnsdorf plays in the Czech National Football League.

Sights

Church of Saints Peter and Paul is the oldest church in the town. It was built in 1774–1776 on the site of the original church from the 13th century. Its late baroque decoration was finished in 1777.

In 1872, the Church of Saint Francis of Assisi in the Romanesque Revival style was built in Studánka. The Old Catholic Church was built in 1875. The neo-Gothic Evangelical church (so-called "Red Church") was built in 1905. The Church of Saint Charles Borromeo was finished in 1912.

Other sights include various Art Nouveau and Neo-Renaissance buildings in the town and Varnsdorf Museum.

Notable people
Joseph Schubert (1754–1837), German composer, violinist and violist
Heinrich Brandler (1881–1967), leader of the Communist Party of Germany
Gernot Zippe (1917–2008), engineer and inventor of Zippe-type centrifuge
Peter Kien (1919–1944), poet
Evelyn Opela (born 1945), German actress
Josef Berger (born 1949), biologist

References

External links

 (in English)
Town's information centre

Cities and towns in the Czech Republic
Populated places in Děčín District
Czech Republic–Germany border crossings